Beaumont is a masculine given name that may refer to the following notable people:
 Beaumont Asquith (1910–1977), English football player
Beaumont Brenan (died 1761), Irish poet and playwright
Beaumont Cranfield (1872–1909), English professional cricketer 
Beaumont Hannant, British musician, producer and DJ
Beaumont Jarrett (1855–1905), English football player
 Beaumont Newhall (1908–1993), curator, art historian, writer, and photographer
 Beaumont Smith (1885–1950), Australian film director, producer and exhibitor